Hurricane Floyd in 1999 was the costliest natural disaster in North Carolina's history, until it was surpassed by Hurricane Florence in 2018.

After the storm, the name Floyd was retired and removed from the Atlantic hurricane naming list. The United States government provided North Carolina with over $277 million in disaster related assistance.

Preparations 
Hurricane Floyd was a long-tracked Cape Verde hurricane that threatened to strike Florida for several days, until a turn toward the north occurred. As Floyd turned away from Florida, the National Hurricane Center (NHC) issued various tropical cyclone warnings and watches for the East Coast of the United States. Late on September 14, the agency issued a hurricane watch for the North Carolina coast, which included the Pamlico and Albemarle sounds. The watch was upgraded to a hurricane warning six hours later. The warning was discontinued on September 16 after Floyd exited the region. Local Weather Forecast Offices in Raleigh, Wilmington, and Morehead City North Carolina, as well as Wakefield, Virginia, issued various flood, flash flood, river, and tornado warnings. The local weather forecast office warned of flooding along the Neuse River 201 hours in advance of the river crest.

Officials opened at least 40 emergency shelters in North Carolina.

Impact 

Hurricane Floyd left more than $3 billion in damage in North Carolina. This made Floyd the costliest hurricane in North Carolina's history. It retained this status until 2018, when Hurricane Florence left $22 billion in damage in the state. With 76 fatalities reported nationwide, Floyd was the deadliest hurricane in the United States since Hurricane Agnes in 1972; 52 of these fatalities occurred in North Carolina. Of the 52 statewide deaths, at least 23 were near or in flooded vehicles, 6 drowned in a capsized boat, and 1 was a fatal car accident. Throughout the state, the hurricane left 500,000 people without electricity. Floyd damaged 56,000 homes statewide, with 17,000 homes left uninhabitable, and another 7,000 homes destroyed. The rains flooded most roads east of Interstate 95, and more than 1,500 people required rescue from their flooded homes.

Hurricane Floyd affected North Carolina less than two weeks after Tropical Storm Dennis moved through the state and saturated grounds. The interaction between Floyd and a cold front dropped torrential rainfall across the eastern United States, with the heaviest totals along the storm's path. A pluviometer north of Southport recorded  of rainfall during the storm, the highest rainfall total in the country associated with Floyd. Kinston recorded  of precipitation during the storm, and Rocky Mount reported  of rainfall; both totals were greater than the expected 100 year storm.

The heavy rains collected in rivers and streams, causing record flooding along the Cape Fear, Chowan, Neuse, Pee Dee, Tar, and Waccaaw rivers. Water gauges at 39 locations reached record levels in the state. Along all of the states' river basins east of Raleigh, stations recorded 500 year floods, and some locations remained flooded for two months. The most significant flooding occurred along the Tar River at Tarboro, more than  higher than the previous record set in 1940. When a river gauge on the Tar near Greenville malfunctioned, a National Weather Service employee took manual observations every hour to document the record flood. Much of Duplin and Greene counties were under water. Some rivers remained above flood stage for over a month, as additional rainfall from Hurricane Irene in October would again raise water levels soon after Floyd.

Wind gusts were much higher, reaching  in Wrightsville Beach, at the elevation of an eight–story building. The National Weather Service issued 20 tornado warnings for the state. Floyd spawned at least 16 tornadoes across eastern North Carolina. Ten of these occurred in the Wilmington area. In Perquimans County, a tornado destroyed two houses and damaged two others.

Along the Atlantic Coast, Albemarle Sound, and river basins, Floyd produced a significant storm tide. The hurricane caused significant beach erosion along south-facing beaches. Two coastal piers lost significant sections from the waves. On Ocracoke Island, high tides washed away dunes at ten locations. On Oak and Topsail Islands, the high waters damaged homes.

Aftermath
On September 16, 1999, then-President Bill Clinton declared an emergency for 66 counties in eastern North Carolina, as requested by Jim Hunt, the state's governor at the time. The declaration authorized Federal Emergency Management Agency (FEMA) to provide resources and personnel, funding for 75% of the cost of debris removal, and loans from the Small Business Administration. Within a week of the declaration, more than 36,000 state residents applied for some form of disaster assistance, mostly for housing or unemployment. FEMA opened 16 disaster recovery centers and a mobile office to assist residents with the application process. In the immediate aftermath of the storm, FEMA spent more than $25.8 million in emergency spending for other agencies, including rescue efforts, sheltering, supplying water, ice, generators, plastic sheeting, and other emergency materials. The federal government deployed 797 employees to North Carolina, including more than 400 housing inspectors.

The federal application period ended on February 29, 2000, by which time more than 88,500 state residents had applied for aid. By a year after Floyd struck North Carolina, the state and federal government had provided $1.9 billion worth of assistance. The largest assistance program was $503 million in low-interest loans from the Small Business Administration, for 12,863 renters, homeowners, and business owners. State and federal resources provided $306.5 million in direct housing assistance. The National Flood Insurance Program paid more than $143 million to 12,843 residents who lost their properties due to floods. For uninsured residents who did not qualify for loans, FEMA provided $92.1 million to 23,873 households in grants. FEMA also provided 2,535 trailers for displaced residents, at the cost of $48 million. The federal government authorized $133.1 million to cover 75% of the cost of repairing and rebuilding public facilities. The Hazard Mitigation Grant Program spent $149.1 million to purchase 2,074 flooded homes and tear them down, preserving the land instead as green space. At the time, it was the largest building buyout program in American history.

See also 

 List of North Carolina hurricanes (1980–1999)
 List of retired Atlantic hurricane names

References 

New Jersey
Floyd (1999)
1999 in North Carolina
Floyd